Staroye is a rural locality (a selo) and the administrative center of Staroselskoye Rural Settlement, Mezhdurechensky District, Vologda Oblast, Russia. The population was 483 as of 2002. There are 10 streets.

Geography 
Staroye is located 30 km southwest of Shuyskoye (the district's administrative centre) by road. Zmeytsyno is the nearest rural locality.

References 

Rural localities in Mezhdurechensky District, Vologda Oblast